Elias Hazrati (born 13 March 1961, Hashtrud) is an Iranian politician, journalist and former military officer. He served as a member of the Parliament of Iran from 1989 until 2004. He is currently editor-in-chief of the daily newspaper Etemad.

Career
He left the army in 1984 and was elected as a member of the parliament from Rasht in 1988 election. He was also reelected in 1992, 1996 and 2000 but was not seek for reelection in 2004 election. after reaching the tenth parliament spoke in Islamic Association of Gilan Azeris.

References

External links

1961 births
Living people
People from East Azerbaijan Province
Deputies of Tehran, Rey, Shemiranat and Eslamshahr
Members of the 3rd Islamic Consultative Assembly
Members of the 4th Islamic Consultative Assembly
Members of the 5th Islamic Consultative Assembly
National Trust Party (Iran) politicians
Islamic Iran Solidarity Party politicians
Members of the 10th Islamic Consultative Assembly
Deputies of Rasht
Iranian newspaper publishers (people)
Islamic Revolutionary Guard Corps personnel of the Iran–Iraq War